Lena Annika Adomat (born 22 June 1964) is a Swedish gymnast. She competed in the 1980 and 1984 Summer Olympics.

References

1964 births
Living people
Gymnasts at the 1980 Summer Olympics
Gymnasts at the 1984 Summer Olympics
Swedish female artistic gymnasts
Olympic gymnasts of Sweden
Sportspeople from Västerås
20th-century Swedish women